WPKM-LP is an Adult Album Alternative formatted broadcast radio station licensed to Parkersburg, West Virginia, serving Metro Parkersburg.  WPKM-LP is owned and operated by West Virginia University at Parkersburg.

References

External links
 The Beet Online
 

2014 establishments in West Virginia
Adult album alternative radio stations in the United States
Radio stations established in 2014
PKM-LP
PKM-LP